Bubal station is a railway station on Gyeonggang Line of the Seoul Metropolitan Subway and semi-high-speed Jungbunaeryuk Line  in Bubal-eup, Icheon, Gyeonggi, South Korea. The former line is used by suburban trains that share the Seoul Subway's ticketing system, and the latter by high-speed Korea Train Express (KTX) trains.

Station Layout

External links

Metro stations in Icheon
Seoul Metropolitan Subway stations
Railway stations opened in 2016
Gyeonggang Line
Korail stations